Cléron is a commune in the Doubs department in the Bourgogne-Franche-Comté region in eastern France.

Population

Sights
 The Château de Cléron is a 14th-century castle, remodelled over the years.  Its privately owned and not open to visitors, though the gardens are opened during the summer. It has been listed since 1988 as a historic site by the French Ministry of Culture.

See also
 Communes of the Doubs department

References

Communes of Doubs